Fuchsia procumbens is a prostrate shrub that is endemic to coastal areas of the North Island of New Zealand. Common names include creeping fuchsia, climbing fuchsia or trailing fuchsia. It belongs to a South Pacific lineage that diverged from all other fuchsias around 30 million years ago. F. procumbens diverged from the other New Zealand (and Tahitian) species around 18 million years ago.

Uses
The small, red, crunchy fruit is edible, although rarely eaten. It has been described as slimy and bland.

References

procumbens
Flora of New Zealand